"Attention" is a Korean-language song, and the debut single recorded by South Korean girl group NewJeans for their debut extended play (EP) New Jeans. It was released by ADOR as the first single from the EP on July 22, 2022.

Background and release
On July 22, NewJeans released the music video for "Attention" as a surprise release, without previously revealing the members' identities or the group concept. The choreography video was released on the same day, and followed swiftly by the announcement of the quintet's debut self-titled extended play (EP), which was confirmed to contain four tracks, including two additional singles.

Composition
With a length of two minute and 58 seconds, "Attention" was described as having "a groovy je ne sais quoi highlighted by a bustling beat" and "key changes that jump between major and minor which keeps its early 2000s R&B-influenced instrumentation minimal". NewJeans member Danielle participated in writing lyrics for the track.

Critical reception 

Jang Jun-hwan wrote for IZM that "it aims for a comfortable listening experience, but will never be boring" and "satisfies the concept and significance of debut in many ways".

Commercial performance
"Attention" debuted at number one and number two on the Billboards South Korea Songs and on the Circle Digital Chart, respectively. It peaked at number one on the Circle Digital Chart in the chart issue dated August 14–20. Overseas, it debuted at number 26 on the RMNZ Hot Singles on the chart issue dated August 8, 2022. On the Global 200 the song peaked at 54. In Singapore and Vietnam the song debuted at eleven.

Charts

Weekly charts

Monthly charts

Year-end charts

Accolades

Release history

References

NewJeans songs
2022 songs
2022 debut singles
Korean-language songs
Billboard Korea K-Pop number-one singles
Hybe Corporation singles